Haymakertown is an unincorporated community in Botetourt County, Virginia, United States.

The Anderson House was listed on the National Register of Historic Places in 1999.

References

Unincorporated communities in Botetourt County, Virginia
Unincorporated communities in Virginia